O with acute (О́ о́; italics: О́ о́) is a letter of the Cyrillic script. In all its forms it looks exactly like the Latin letter O with acute (Ó ó Ó ó).

Usage
 and other Cyrillic vowels with accents are mostly found in East Slavic languages in words in Russian: замо́к, дóма, звóнит, etc.

These kinds of words are longer than one syllable carries an accent. The accents are fundamental  vowels are pronounced with more intensity and do not change their sound within words.

In East Slavic languages, just like any other stressed vowels in Slavic languages, mainly in the East Slavic languages are important for native speakers to understand correctly.

Computing codes
Being a relatively recent letter, not present in any legacy 8-bit Cyrillic encoding, the letter О́ is not represented directly by a precomposed character in Unicode either; it has to be composed as О+◌́ (U+0301).

Related letters and other similar characters
O o : Latin letter O
Ó ó : Latin letter Ó - a Czech, Faroese, Hungarian, Icelandic, Kashubian, Polish, Sorbian, and Slovak letter
О о : Cyrillic letter О
Cyrillic characters in Unicode

References

Letters with acute
Cyrillic letters with diacritics